The 2nd Annual Nickelodeon Kids' Choice Awards was held on April 18, 1988, from the Conan Sword and Sorcery Spectacular Arena at Universal Studios Hollywood. This was the first event held under this title, and first to feature a live audience, as well as celebrity hosts and attendees, while the first ceremony occurred the previous year in 1987 as The Big Ballot, and only featured taped segments linked together by its studio hosts. The show also featured the first "KCA trophy", which was created by original logo designers Tom Corey and Scott Nash.

Performers
 The Fat Boys ("Wipe Out")
 Debbie Gibson ("Shake Your Love" and "Out of the Blue")

Presenters
 Wil Wheaton and Staci Keanan - presented Favorite Movie Actor and Favorite Movie Actress
 Tiffany Brissette and Danny Pintauro - presented Favorite Sports Team and Favorite Male Athlete
 Amanda Peterson and Rob Stone - presented Favorite TV Actor and Favorite TV Actress via video
 Josie Davis and Mackenzie Astin - presented Favorite Female Vocalist and Favorite Male Vocalist

The awards for Favorite Movie, Favorite Female Athlete, Favorite TV Show and Favorite Song were presented by co-hosts Debbie Gibson, Brian Robbins and Dan Schneider in small vignettes throughout the show. In addition, Wesley Eure and Charles Barkley revealed the winner for Favorite Female Athlete in a small Finders Keepers segment.

Winners and nominees
Winners are listed first, in bold. Other nominees are in alphabetical order.

Movies

Television

Music

Sports

References

Nickelodeon Kids' Choice Awards
Kids' Choice Awards
Kids' Choice Awards
April 1988 events in the United States